Harry Boyd Earhart (1870–1954) was an American business executive and philanthropist.

Biography

Early life
Harry Boyd Earhart was born in 1870.

Career
He bought the struggling Buffalo, New York-based White Star Refining Company in 1911, and moved it to Michigan, just as the car industry was beginning to develop there. White Star developed a chain of gas stations and had its own refinery, and was eventually acquired by the Vacuum Oil Company in 1930, which later became Mobil.

Philanthropist
He founded the Earhart Foundation, which has identified talented and influential scholars such as Friedrich A. Hayek and Milton Friedman. Nine winners of the Nobel Prize in economics were Earhart Foundation fellows earlier in their careers. Other Nobel-winning economists who benefited from Earhart funding include Gary Becker, James M. Buchanan, Ronald Coase, Robert Lucas, Daniel McFadden, Vernon L. Smith, and George Stigler.

Death
He died in 1954.

Legacy
After his death, Earhart's land and mansion in Ann Arbor, Michigan became part of Concordia University, Ann Arbor, Michigan in 1963.

References

1870 births
1954 deaths
Businesspeople from Ann Arbor, Michigan
American businesspeople in the oil industry
American philanthropists